In mathematics, the Cartan model is a differential graded algebra that computes the equivariant cohomology of a space.

References
 Stefan Cordes, Gregory Moore, Sanjaye Ramgoolam, Lectures on 2D Yang-Mills Theory, Equivariant Cohomology and Topological Field Theories, 1994.

Algebraic topology